Vaughn's Stage Coach Stop is a historic stagecoach stop located near Ridgeway, Fairfield County, South Carolina.  It was built about 1820, and is a two-story, weatherboarded frame, gable-roofed residence with a double-pile and central hall floor plan. The building sits on a foundation of stone piers, has end chimneys, rear shed rooms, and a left rear addition. The façade features a one-story, shed-roofed porch with a plain wooden balustrade supported by six slender wooden posts.

It was added to the National Register of Historic Places in 1984.

References

Transportation buildings and structures on the National Register of Historic Places in South Carolina
Buildings and structures completed in 1820
Buildings and structures in Fairfield County, South Carolina
National Register of Historic Places in Fairfield County, South Carolina
Stagecoach stations on the National Register of Historic Places